is a Japanese voice actress who is affiliated with Arts Vision. She was formerly affiliated with Mausu Promotion.

Filmography

Anime television
Cyborg 009 (2001) (Hilda, Shinichi Ibaraki (child))
Naruto (Kin Tsuchi)
Naruto Shippūden (Konohamaru)
Secret of Cerulean Sand (Miria)
Tide-Line Blue (Angie)
Tokyo Underground (Kashin (child))

OVA
Lupin III: Return of the Magician (Announcer)

Anime films
Megumi no Daigo – Kajiba no Bakayaro (High School Student)

Games
3-Nen B-Gumi Kinpachi Sensei: Densetsu no Kyoudan ni Tate! (Nami Mizushima)
Everybody's Tennis (Kaori)
Halo: Combat Evolved (Cortana)
Halo 2 (Cortana)
Halo 3 (Cortana)
Halo: Reach (Cortana, Catherine Elizabeth Halsey, MD, PhD)
Lunar Knights (Ursula)
Resident Evil: Operation Raccoon City (Willow)
Shin Bokura no Taiyō Gyakushū no Sabata (Trinity)
Way of the Samurai 2 (Kyojiro Kagenuma)

Dubbing

Live Action
Gossip Girl (Duchess Catherine Beaton (Mädchen Amick))
Halo (Cortana (Jen Taylor))
Hollow Man (Boy in Car)
John Q. (Reporter)
Lost Command (Countess de Clairefons)
Road Trip (Wendy)
The West Wing (Ginger)
Y Tu Mamá También (Ana Morelos)

Animation
A Kind of Magic (Willow)
Gargoyles (Fox)
The Little Mermaid: Ariel's Beginning (Princess Adella)
Spider-Man (Alisa Silver)
X-Men: Evolution (Rogue)

References

External links
Official agency profile 

1969 births
Living people
Arts Vision voice actors
Japanese video game actresses
Japanese voice actresses
Mausu Promotion voice actors
Voice actresses from Kanagawa Prefecture
20th-century Japanese actresses
21st-century Japanese actresses